Viscount Fitzhardinge is an extinct title in the Peerage of Ireland. It was created on 14 July 1663 for Charles Berkeley, later Earl of Falmouth, of the Bruton branch of the Berkeley family, with the subsidiary title of Baron Berkeley of Rathdowne, also in the Peerage of Ireland. It passed by special remainder to Charles' father, Charles, then to Maurice, elder brother of the first viscount, and then to their younger brother, John. The title became extinct on John's death in 1712.

Viscounts Fitzhardinge (1663)
Charles Berkeley, 1st Viscount Fitzhardinge (bef. 1636–1665) (created Earl of Falmouth 1664)
Charles Berkeley, 2nd Viscount Fitzhardinge (1600–1668)
Maurice Berkeley, 3rd Viscount Fitzhardinge (1628–1690)
John Berkeley, 4th Viscount Fitzhardinge (1650–1712)

See also
Earl of Falmouth
Baron Berkeley
Baron Berkeley of Stratton
Earl FitzHardinge
Baron FitzHardinge

References

Extinct viscountcies in the Peerage of Ireland
Viscount
1663 establishments in the British Empire
Noble titles created in 1663
Peerages created with special remainders